This is a list of rural localities in Bashkortostan. The Republic of Bashkortostan,, also historically known as Bashkiria, is a federal subject of Russia (a republic (state)). It is located between the Volga River and the Ural Mountains. Its capital is the city of Ufa. With a population of 4,072,292 as of the 2010 Census, Bashkortostan is the most populous republic in Russia.

Abzelilovsky District 
Rural localities in Abzelilovsky District:

 Abdulgazino
 Abdulmambetovo
 Abzelilovo
 Akhmetovo
 Almukhametovo
 Almukhametovo
 Amangildino
 Askarovo
 Aslayevo
 Atavdy
 Aumyshevo
 Avnyash
 Aygyrbatkan
 Ayusazovo
 Baimovo
 Bikkulovo
 Bolshegabdinovo
 Borisovo
 Bulatovo
 Burangulovo
 Dautovo
 Davletovo
 Davletshino
 Derevnya Samarskogo otdeleniya sovkhoza
 Geologorazvedka
 Gusevo, Bashkortostan
 Idyash-Kuskarovo
 Ishbuldino
 Ishkildino
 Ishkulovo
 Iskakovo
 Iskuzhino
 Kalmakovo
 Kazmashevo
 Khalilovo
 Khamitovo
 Khusainovo
 Kirdasovo
 Krasnaya Bashkiriya
 Kulukasovo
 Kusheyevo
 Kusimovo
 Kusimovskogo Rudnika
 Kuzhanovo
 Makhmutovo
 Maygashta
 Mikhaylovka
 Murakayevo
 Niyazgulovo
 Nizhneye Abdryashevo
 Novobalapanovo
 Ozernoye
 Pervomaysky
 Pokrovka
 Rakhmetovo
 Ravilovo
 Ryskuzhino
 Saitkulovo
 Salavat-sovkhoz
 Salavatovo
 Samarskoye
 Selivanovsky
 Severny
 Sharipovo
 Starobalapanovo
 Sukhoye Ozero
 Taksyrovo
 Tal-Kuskarovo
 Tashbulatovo
 Tashtimerovo
 Tashtuy
 Telyashevo
 Tepyanovo
 Tirmen
 Tselinny
 Tuishevo
 Tupakovo
 Ulyandy
 Uralsky
 Utyaganovo
 Verkhneye Abdryashevo
 Yakty-Kul
 Yangelskoye
 Yangi-Aul
 Yarlykapovo
 Yaykarovo
 Yelimbetovo
 Yenikeyevo
 Yuldashevo
 Zelyonaya Polyana

Alsheyevsky District 
Rural localities in Alsheyevsky District:

 1490 km
 Abdrashitovo
 Abdulkarimovo
 Adamovka
 Akberda
 Aksenovo
 Aldarovo
 Aleksandrovka
 Andrianovka
 Avryuztamak
 Aydagulovo
 Aytugan
 Balgazy
 Balkan
 Bayazitovo
 Baydakovka
 Belyakovka
 Bikchagul
 Budanyar
 Bugulminka
 Chaykino
 Chebenli
 Chelnokovka
 Churakayevo
 Churayevo
 Dim
 Fan
 Gayniyamak
 Grigoryevka
 Ibrayevo
 Idrisovo
 Igenche
 Irik
 Irshat
 Kamenka
 Karan
 Karmyshevo
 Kayrakly
 Kazanka
 Khanzharovo
 Khrustalevo
 Khusain
 Kim
 Kipchak-Askarovo
 Klinovka
 Kolonka
 Krasnaya Zvezda
 Krasny Klin
 Krymsky
 Kunkas
 Kyzyl Yul
 Linda
 Maloabdrashitovo
 Maloakkulayevo
 Mechnikovo
 Mendyanovo
 Mikhaylovka
 Mikhaylovka
 Murzagulovo
 Neforoshchanka
 Nigmatullino
 Nikifarovo
 Nikolayevka
 Nizhneye Avryuzovo
 Novokonstantinovka
 Novosepyashevo
 Novovozdvizhenka
 Novy Kipchak
 Novyye Balgazy
 Orlovka
 Osorgino
 Otrada
 Rayevsky
 Samodurovka
 Sarayevo
 Sartbash
 Saryshevo
 Selo sanatoriya imeni Chekhova
 Shavranovo
 Shishma
 Slak
 Staraya Vasilyevka
 Staroakkulayevo
 Starosepyashevo
 Stepanovka
 Sulpan
 Tashkichu
 Tashly
 Tashtyube
 Tavrichanka
 Truntaishevo
 Tukmakbash
 Tyubeteyevo
 Urazmetovo
 Urnyak
 Ustyevka
 Uvarovka
 Verkhneye Avryuzovo
 Vozdvizhenka
 Yarabaykul
 Yartashly
 Zelyony Klin

Arkhangelsky District 
Rural localities in Arkhangelsky District:

 Abzanovo
 Akkulevo
 Alexeyevskoye
 Andreyevka
 Arkhangelskoye
 Askino
 Asy
 Aytmembetovo
 Azovo
 Bakaldinskoye
 Basinovka
 Belorus-Alexandrovka
 Berezovka
 Beysovo
 Blagoveshchenka
 Chik-Yelga
 Gayfullinskoye
 Gorny
 Irnykshi
 Karagay
 Karakul
 Kartashevka
 Kazanka
 Kizgi
 Knyazevo
 Krasnaya Gorka
 Krasnaya Regizla
 Krasny Zilim
 Kumurly
 Kurgash
 Kuznetsovka
 Kysyndy
 Kyzylyarovo
 Lagutovka
 Lukinsky
 Magash
 Maxim Gorky
 Mikhaylovka
 Mullakayevo
 Nikolayevka
 Novochishma
 Novokyzylyarovo
 Novoshareyevo
 Novoustinovka
 Novyye Sarty
 Orlovka
 Petropavlovka
 Pobeda
 Priuralovka
 Priuralye
 Rodinsky
 Sagitovo
 Shakirovka
 Sukhopol
 Tavakachevo
 Terekly
 Troitskoye
 Tukmakly
 Ubaraly
 Usakly
 Uspenka
 Ustye-Bassy
 Uzunlarovo
 Valentinovka
 Vasilyevka
 Verkhniye Irnykshi
 Verkhniye Lemezy
 Verkhny Frolovsky
 Zaitovo
 Zarya

Askinsky District 
Rural localities in Askinsky District:

 Alyagish
 Amirovo
 Arbashevo
 Askino
 Avaday
 Barakhayevka
 Bashkortostan
 Bazanchatovo
 Bilgish
 Bolshoye Ozero
 Chad
 Chishma-Urakayevo
 Churashevo
 Chyornoye Ozero
 Davlyatovka
 Dultsevka
 Gumbino
 Kamashady
 Kartkisyak
 Kashkino
 Kigazy
 Klyuchevoy Log
 Klyuchi
 Korolyovo
 Kshlau-Yelga
 Kubiyazy
 Kuchanovo
 Kungak
 Kungakbash
 Kushkul
 Kuyashtyr
 Lyubimovka
 Matala
 Mikhaylovka
 Muta-Yelga
 Novaya Burma
 Novaya Kara
 Novokochkildino
 Novy Kartkisyak
 Novy Mutabash
 Novy Suyush
 Novyye Bagazy
 Novyye Kazanchi
 Olkhovy Klyuch
 Petropavlovka
 Russkaya Kara
 Shorokhovo
 Staraya Kara
 Starokochkildino
 Stary Mutabash
 Staryye Kazanchi
 Stepanovka
 Sultanay
 Sultanbekovo
 Talog
 Tashlykul
 Tulguzbash
 Tupraly
 Tyuysk
 Ulu-Yelga
 Upkankul
 Urmankul
 Urmiyazy
 Urshady
 Ust-Tabaska
 Utyashino
 Vash-Yazy
 Verkhnenikolskoye
 Yanaul
 Yankisyak
 Yerma-Yelan
 Yevbulyak

Aurgazinsky District 
Rural localities in Aurgazinsky District:

 Abdrakhmanovo
 Abdullino
 Akhmerovo
 Akhmetovo
 Alexandrovka
 Alexeyevka
 Alexeyevka
 Amzya
 Andreyevka
 Arslanovo
 Asavbashevo
 Baishevo
 Bakayevo
 Balyklykul
 Baykal
 Belogorsky
 Belogorsky
 Berezovka
 Berlek
 Bishkain
 Bolotino
 Borisovka
 Chishma
 Chishma
 Chubaytal
 Chulpan
 Chulpan
 Chuvash-Karamaly
 Chuvashsky Nagadak
 Dadanovka
 Daryevka
 Daryino
 Dobrovolnoye
 Dubrovka
 Dyurtuli
 Gumerovo
 Ibrayevo
 Igenche
 Ishly
 Ismagilovo
 Ivanovka
 Kalchiburan
 Kamenka
 Kebyachevo
 Khasanovo
 Knyazevka
 Krasny Vostok
 Kshanny
 Kultura
 Kurmanayevo
 Kushkul
 Kuyezbashevo
 Kuzminovka
 Makarovo
 Malaya Ivanovka
 Maloye Ibrayevo
 Maly Nagadak
 Maneyevo
 Mars
 Maryanovka
 Meseli
 Mikhaylovka
 Minnibayevo
 Muksino
 Muradym
 Mustafino
 Nadezhdina
 Nagadak
 Naumkino
 Nazmutdinovo
 Nikolayevka
 Nikolsk
 Nikolskoye
 Nizhniye Lekandy
 Nizhny Begenyash
 Novoadzitarovo
 Novochelatkanovo
 Novofedorovka
 Novogurovka
 Novoitikeyevo
 Novomustafino
 Novotimoshkino
 Novy Kalchir
 Novyye Karamaly
 Pokrovka
 Potashevka
 Sabanchi
 Salikhovo
 Semyonkino
 Sheverli
 Shlanly
 Sitdik-Mullino
 Sosnovka
 Staraya Ivanovka
 Staroabsalyamovo
 Staroitikeyevo
 Starokuzyakovo
 Staromakarovo
 Starotimoshkino
 Staroye Ibrayevo
 Staryye Karamaly
 Stepanovka
 Subkhangulovo
 Suleymanovo
 Sultanmuratovo
 Talnik
 Tashlykul
 Tashtamak
 Tatarsky Nagadak
 Tereshkovka
 Tolbazy
 Tolmachevka
 Trudovka
 Tryapino
 Tukayevo
 Tursugali
 Turumbet
 Tyubyakovo
 Uksunny
 Usmanovo
 Usmanovo
 Ust-Belishevo
 Utarkul
 Uteymullino
 Verkhniye Lekandy
 Verkhny Begenyash
 Veselovka
 Volkovo
 Vyazovka
 Yakty-Yul
 Yermolayevka
 Yulamanovo
 Yuldashevo
 Zaitovo
 Zhuravlyovka

Bakalinsky District 
Rural localities in Bakalinsky District:

 Akhmanovo
 Akhmerovo
 Alexandrovka
 Bakaly
 Balchikly
 Batrak
 Budyonnovets
 Bugabashevo
 Buzyorovo
 Chumalya
 Derevnya penkozavoda
 Diyashevo
 Dubrovka
 Galiullinka
 Georgiyevka
 Gurdybashevo
 Ivanovka
 Kamayevo
 Kamayevo
 Kamyshlytamak
 Kandalakbashevo
 Karpovka
 Kazanchi
 Kileyevo
 Kilkabyzovo
 Krasnaya Gorka
 Kurcheyevo
 Kuruch-Karan
 Kushtiryakovo
 Kyzyl Bulyak
 Mikhaylovka
 Mikhaylovka
 Mirzaitovo
 Mullanurovo
 Muncha-Yelga
 Mustafino
 Nagaybakovo
 Narat-Chukur
 Narat-Yelga
 Nikolayevka
 Nizhneye Novokosteyevo
 Novoagbyazovo
 Novoalmetyevo
 Novogusevo
 Novoilikovo
 Novokatayevo
 Novokosteyevo
 Novokuruchevo
 Novoostankovo
 Novosasykul
 Novotroitskoye
 Novoursayevo
 Novoye Azmeyevo
 Novy Shugan
 Novy Tumutuk
 Novyye Balykly
 Novyye Maty
 Novyye Sharashli
 Novyye Usy
 Orlovka
 Palchikovo
 Petrovka
 Petrovka
 Plodoyagodnaya
 Pokrovka
 Sakatovo
 Sazonovka
 Sosnovka
 Starogusevo
 Staroilikovo
 Starokatayevo
 Starokosteyevo
 Starokuruchevo
 Starokuyanovo
 Staroye Azmeyevo
 Staryye Balykly
 Staryye Maty
 Staryye Sharashli
 Suyundyukovo
 Taktagulovo
 Tally-Syza
 Umirovo
 Urman
 Urmananayevo
 Ustyumovo
 Utarovo
 Verkhnetroitskoye
 Vesyolaya Polyana
 Vorsinka
 Yultimirovka
 Yurminka
 Zirikly

Baltachevsky District 
Rural localities in Baltachevsky District:

 Annovka
 Ardagysh
 Asavka
 Bigildino
 Bogdanovo
 Bulyak
 Chipchikovo
 Chishma
 Chiyatau
 Chukaly
 Churapanovo
 Churtanlykul
 Gareyka
 Imyanovo
 Ishtiryakovo
 Kazanka
 Kizganbashevo
 Kumyazy
 Kundashly
 Kuntugushevo
 Kurachevo
 Kuzeyevo
 Kyzyl Vostok
 Kyzyl-Kul
 Magashly-Almantayevo
 Managazovo
 Mata
 Mishcherovo
 Mishkino
 Nacharovo
 Nizhneivanayevo
 Nizhnekansiyarovo
 Nizhnekaryshevo
 Nizhnesikiyazovo
 Nizhneyanaktayevo
 Norkino
 Novobaltachevo
 Novodyurtyukeyevo
 Novotoshkurovo
 Novourazayevo
 Novoyaksheyevo
 Novoyamurzino
 Novoyanbayevo
 Rakhimkulovo
 Sandugach
 Seytyakovo
 Shavyady
 Shtandy
 Starobaltachevo
 Starodyurtyukeyevo
 Staroilikeyevo
 Starosultangulovo
 Starotimkino
 Staroyaksheyevo
 Staroyamurzino
 Staroyanbayevo
 Staryye Kargaly
 Tashly-Yelga
 Tibelevo
 Toshkurovo
 Tuchubayevo
 Tuktayevo
 Tutagachevo
 Tuzlubino
 Tykanovo
 Urazayevo
 Urta-Yelga
 Usmanovo
 Verkhneivanayevo
 Verkhnekansiyarovo
 Verkhnekaryshevo
 Verkhneyanaktayevo
 Yakunino
 Yalangachevo
 Yantimirovo
 Zilyazekulevo

Baymaksky District 
Rural localities in Baymaksky District:

 1st Itkulovo
 1st Turkmenevo
 2nd Itkulovo
 2nd Turkemenevo
 Abdrakhmanovo
 Abdulkarimovo
 Abzakovo
 Akhmerovo
 Akmurun
 Aktau
 Algazino
 Aminevo
 Baimovo
 Baishevo
 Bakhtigareyevo
 Bakhtigareyevo
 Baymurzino
 Bekeshevo
 Beterya
 Bilyalovo
 Bogachyovo
 Bolshebasayevo
 Buranbayevo
 Burzyan-Yelga
 Chingizovo
 Davletovo
 Derevnya Kozhzavoda
 Gadelbayevo
 Galeyevo
 Gumerovo
 Ishberda
 Ishey
 Ishmukhametovo
 Ishmurzino
 Islamovo
 Isyanbetovo
 Isyanovo
 Kalinino
 Karatal
 Karyshkino
 Kazanka
 Khasanovo
 Komsomol
 Krepostnoy Zilair
 Kugidel
 Kulchurovo
 Kultaban
 Kuseyevo
 Kuvatovo
 Kuyantayevo
 Meryasovo
 Mukasovo 1-e
 Mukasovo 2-e
 Mullakayevo
 Munasipovo
 Nazarovo
 Nigamatovo
 Nizhneidrisovo
 Nizhnetagirovo
 Nizhnetavlykayevo
 Nizhneyaikbayevo
 Oktyabr
 Pokrovka
 Sakmar
 Saksay
 Saygafar
 Semyonovo
 Semyonovskoye
 Shulka
 Sosnovka
 Stary Sibay
 Taktagulovo
 Tatlybayevo
 Temyasovo
 Tubinsky
 Umetbayevo
 Ural
 Urgaza
 Verkhneidrisovo
 Verkhnemambetovo
 Verkhnetagirovo
 Verkhnetavlykayevo
 Verkhneyaikbayevo
 Yangazino
 Yanzigitovo
 Yaratovo
 Yarmukhametovo
 Yuluk
 Yumashevo
 Zelimovo

Belebeyevsky District 
Rural localities in Belebeyevsky District:

 Adelkino
 Akbasar
 Akkain
 Aksakovo
 Alexeyevka
 Annenkovo
 Annovka
 Azekeyevo
 Baymurzino
 Bayrak
 Bazhenovo
 Berezovka
 Brik-Alga
 Bulanovka
 Cheganly
 Chermasan
 Chubukaran
 Chubukaran
 Derevnya razyezda Maksyutovo
 Derevnya razyezda Ryabash
 Durasovo
 Fyodorovka
 Glukhovskaya
 Gusarkino
 Ik-Vershina
 Ilkino
 Irek
 Ismagilovo
 Kain-Yelga
 Kanash
 Kazanlytamak
 Kirillovka
 Kluchevka
 Krasnaya Zarya
 Krasnorechka
 Krasnoyar
 Kum-Kosyak
 Kush-Yelga
 Malinovka
 Maloaleksandrovka
 Martynovo
 Metevbash
 Mezhdugornoye
 Mikhaylovsky
 Mochilki
 Nadezhdino
 Novaya Derevnya
 Novokazanka
 Novonikolayevka
 Novosarayevo
 Novosemenkino
 Orlovka
 Pakhar
 Parafeyevka
 Podlesnoye
 Pokrovka
 Pyzhyanovsky
 Rassvet
 Repyevka
 Rodniki
 Russkaya Shveytsariya
 Savkino
 Selo Tsentralnoy usadby plemzavoda imeni Maxima Gorkogo
 Selo sanatoriya Glukhovskogo
 Serdyuki
 Sharovka
 Shelkanovo
 Siushka
 Skobelevka
 Slakbash
 Sosnovy Bor
 Starosemenkino
 Svetlovka
 Svoboda
 Tuzlukush
 Usen-Ivanovskoye
 Uteyka
 Verkhneyermolgi
 Verovka
 Vesyolaya Roshcha
 Yangi-Kyuch
 Yekaterinovka
 Yermolkino
 Znamenka

Belokataysky District 
Rural localities in Belokataysky District:

 Absalyamovo
 Aputovo
 Ashayevo
 Atarsha
 Aydakayevo
 Aygyryal
 Belyanka
 Kadyrovo
 Karantrav
 Karlykhanovo
 Kayupovo
 Khaybatovo
 Kirikeyevo
 Krasny Muravey
 Krasny Pakhar
 Kurgashka
 Levali
 Maygaza
 Medyatovo
 Morozovka
 Munasovo
 Nizhneutyashevo
 Nizhny Iskush
 Nogushi
 Novaya Maskara
 Novobelokatay
 Perevoz
 Shakarla
 Shaydala
 Shigayevka
 Sokolki
 Sosnovka
 Sosnovy Log
 Staraya Maskara
 Starobelokatay
 Tardavka
 Urakovo
 Urgala
 Vaselga
 Verkhneutyashevo
 Verkhny Iskush
 Voskhod
 Yanybayevo
 Yemashi
 Yuldashevo

Beloretsky District 
Rural localities in Beloretsky District:

 Abzakovo
 Aisovo
 Akhmerovo
 Alexandrovka
 Arsky Kamen
 Aryshparovo
 Assy
 Aygir
 Azikeyevo
 Aznagulovo
 Aznalkino
 Bakeyevo
 Belsky
 Berdagulovo
 Brish
 Brishtamak
 Buganak
 Butayevo
 Bzyak
 Chernovka
 Chyorny Klyuch
 Dachnaya
 Dubinino
 Gabdyukovo
 Inzer
 Ishlya
 Iskushta
 Ismakayevo
 Kadysh
 Kaga
 Kagarmanovo
 Karagay-Yurt
 Karagayly
 Kartalinskaya Zapan
 Kartaly
 Kasmakty
 Katarysh
 Katayka
 Khaybullino
 Khusainovo
 Komarovo
 Korpusta
 Kudashmanovo
 Kulmas
 Kumbino
 Kuzgun-Akhmerovo
 Lomovka
 Makhmutovo
 Manyshta
 Maygashlya
 Mukhametovo
 Muldakayevo
 Nikolayevka
 Nizhny Avzyan
 Nizhnyaya Manyava
 Nizhnyaya Tyulma
 Nizhnyaya Yatva
 Novoabzakovo
 Novobelskoye
 Novokhasanovo
 Nukatovo
 Otnurok (selo)
 Otnurok (village)
 Revet
 Roshcha
 Rysakayevo
 Safargulovo
 Saryshka
 Satra
 Sermenevo
 Shigayevo
 Shushpa
 Sosnovka
 Tara
 Tikhy Klyuch
 Tirlyan
 Tukan
 Uluyelga
 Umetbayevo
 Uraltau
 Usmangali
 Utkalevo
 Uzyan
 Uzyanbash
 Verkhnearshinsky
 Verkhnebelsky
 Verkhny Avzyan
 Yandek
 Yelan
 Yermotayevo
 Zapadnaya Maygashlya
 Zheleznodorozhny
 Zigaza
 Zuyakovo

Birsky District 
Rural localities in Birsky District:

 Akkainovo
 Akudi
 Akudibashevo
 Alexandrovka
 Andreyevka
 Aybashevo
 Aygildino
 Bakhtybayevo
 Bazhenovo
 Bekmurzino
 Berezovka
 Chishma
 Chishma
 Chistyye Prudy
 Demidovsky
 Desyatkino
 Kalinniki
 Kamyshenka
 Kandakovka
 Kostarevo
 Koyanovo
 Kriushi
 Kusekeyevo
 Kuzovo
 Lezhebokovo
 Luch
 Malosukhoyazovo
 Mansurovo
 Mayadykovo
 Mordvinovka
 Nikolayevka
 Nikolsky
 Nizhnelachentau
 Novobaishevo
 Novobiktimirovo
 Novoburnovo
 Novodesyatkino
 Novokulchubayevo
 Novopetrovo
 Novoyantuzovo
 Osinovka
 Pechenkino
 Penkovo
 Pioner
 Pityakovo
 Popovka
 Romanovka
 Samosadka
 Shamsutdin
 Shelkanovo
 Shestykovo
 Silantyevo
 Simkino
 Sorvikha
 Sosnovy Bor
 Srednebazanovo
 Starobazanovo
 Starobiktimirovo
 Staroburnovo
 Staropetrovo
 Staroyezhevo
 Startsino
 Suslovo
 Uguzevo
 Uleyevo
 Urnyak
 Usakovo
 Uzhara
 Verkhnelachentau
 Voznesenka
 Vyazovsky
 Yangitau
 Yemashevo
 Zelyony
 Zuyevo

Bizhbulyaksky District 
Rural localities in Bizhbulyaksky District:

 Aitovo
 Alexandrovka
 Alexeyevka
 Alexeyevka
 Antonovka
 Aznayevo
 Barsh
 Bazlyk
 Berezovka
 Bikkulovo
 Bizhbulyak
 Bogolyubovka
 Chulpan
 Dyomsky
 Dyusyanovo
 Ibraykino
 Ignashkino
 Isyakayevo
 Ittikhat
 Ivanovka
 Kachkinovo
 Kalinovka
 Kamenka
 Kanareyka
 Kandry-Kul
 Kanykayevo
 Karimovo
 Kasimovka
 Kenger-Meneuz
 Khomutovka
 Kistenli-Bogdanovo
 Kistenli-Ivanovka
 Kosh-Yelga
 Kozhay-Ikskiye Vershiny
 Krasnaya Gorka
 Kunakulovo
 Lassirma
 Lysogorka
 Maly Meneuz
 Maly Sedyak
 Meneuz-Moskva
 Mikhaylovka
 Milisonovka
 Mullanur-Bakhitovo
 Muradymovo
 Musino
 Naberezhny
 Nizhnyaya Kurmaza
 Novaya Samarka
 Novy Biktyash
 Olkhovka
 Pchelnik
 Petrovka
 Petrovka
 Progress
 Purlyga
 Razayevka
 Rudniki
 Sarmandeyevka
 Sedyakbash
 Sene-Purnas
 Shkapovo
 Shomyrtly
 Sosnovka
 Stepanovka
 Stepanovka
 Sukhorechka
 Svetlovka
 Takmakkaran
 Tukay
 Tulubayevo
 Usak-Kichu
 Vasilkino
 Verkhnyaya Kurmaza
 Vishnevka
 Yegorovka
 Yelbulak-Matveyevka
 Yelbulaktamak
 Yermolkino
 Zirikly
 Ziriklytamak

Blagovarsky District 
Rural localities in Blagovarsky District:

 1st Alkino
 6th Alkino
 Agardy
 Akhmetovo
 Akhunovo
 Alexeyevka
 Balyshly
 Barsuan
 Bashbulyak
 Bashterma
 Bik-Usak
 Blagovar
 Buzoulyk
 Chatra
 Chulpan 2-y
 Dmitriyevka
 Dombrovka
 Dusmetovo
 Kamyshly
 Kargalybash
 Kargalytamak
 Kashkalashi
 Khlebodarovka
 Kirillo-Karmasan
 Klimentovka
 Kob-Pokrovka
 Kugul
 Kullekul
 Kyzyl-Chishma
 Kyzyl-Yulduz
 Lomovo
 Mirny
 Moiseyevo
 Neyfeld
 Nizhniye Kargaly
 Novoabzanovo
 Novoalexandrovka
 Novokonstantinovka
 Novonikolskoye
 Novy Bulyak
 Novy Syntash
 Novy Troitsky
 Obshchina
 Pervomaysky
 Pokrovka 2-ya
 Prishib
 Samarino
 Sarayly
 Shameyevo
 Sharlyk
 Slakbash
 Staroabzanovo
 Staroamirovo
 Starogornovo
 Starokucherbayevo
 Starousmanovo
 Stary Syntash
 Staryye Sanny
 Syntashtamak
 Tabuldak
 Takchura
 Tallykul
 Tan
 Toporinka
 Troitsk
 Troitsky
 Tyurkeyevo
 Tyuryushtamak
 Udryakbash
 Uly-Aryama
 Usmanovo
 Uzybash
 Verkhniye Kargaly
 Viktorovka
 Vostochny
 Yalankul
 Yamakay
 Yanbakty
 Yanyshevo
 Yazykovo
 Zapadny
 Zarechny
 Zur-Bulyak

Blagoveshchensky District 
Rural localities in Blagoveshchensky District

 2nd Alexandrovka
 Akhlystino
 Alexandrovka
 Alexandrovka
 Andreyevka
 Anninskaya
 Aramelevka
 Arkaul
 Ashkashla
 Bedeyeva Polyana
 Berezovka
 Beryozovaya Polyana
 Bishtinovo
 Bogorodskoye
 Bolshoy Log
 Bulatovo
 Bulychyovo
 Bykovo
 Dachnaya
 Dmitriyevka
 Emanino
 Fayzullinskoye
 Fyodorovka
 Gorny Urazbay
 Gumerovo
 Ilyino-Polyana
 Ilyinsky
 Kamennaya Polyana
 Karagaykul
 Kazanka
 Khristolyubovo
 Klyuchi
 Krasnaya Burna
 Kuliki
 Kurech
 Kurgashtamak
 Mikhaylovka
 Mukhametdinovo
 Nikolayevka
 Nikolskoye
 Nizhny Izyak
 Novoblagoveshchenka
 Novoilikovo
 Novominzitarovo
 Novonadezhdino
 Novonikolsky
 Novyye Turbasly
 Olkhovka
 Orlovka
 Oshmyanka
 Osipovka
 Pekarskaya
 Pokrovka
 Pokrovskoye
 Preobrazhenskoye
 Pushkino
 Rozhdestvenskoye
 Rudny
 Sanninskoye
 Sedovka
 Sedyash
 Sergeyevka
 Serguyaz
 Shalana
 Sharipovka
 Shchepnoye
 Sitniki
 Sokolovskoye
 Sologubovka
 Starogilevo
 Staroilikovo
 Staronadezhdino
 Suneyevka
 Tanayka
 Tornovka
 Troshkino
 Truzhenik
 Tugay
 Tuktarovo
 Turushla
 Udelno-Duvaney
 Ukman
 Usa
 Usa-Stepanovka
 Usabash
 Uspenka
 Ustyugovsky
 Varyaz
 Verkhny Izyak
 Vladimirovka
 Volkovo
 Voskresenka
 Yablochny
 Yazykovo
 Yevgrafovka
 Yezhovka

Burayevsky District 
Rural localities in Burayevsky District:

 Abdrashbash
 Abdullino
 Abzaevo
 Aitovo
 Aldarovo
 Altayevo
 Ardashevo
 Arnyashevo
 Arslanbekovo
 Asavtamak
 Azyakovo
 Bakaly
 Baysakino
 Bayshady
 Berlyachevo
 Biginyayevo
 Bikzyan
 Bolshebadrakovo
 Bolsheshukshanovo
 Burayevo
 Bustanayevo
 Chelkakovo
 Chishma-Burayevo
 Dautlarovo
 Davlekanovo
 Dyusmetovo
 Frunze
 Gumerovo
 Ishmametovo
 Kadrikovo
 Kainlykovo
 Kalmykovo
 Kam-Klyuch
 Kamelevo
 Karabayevo
 Karatamak
 Karazirikovo
 Kashkalevo
 Kasiyarovo
 Khaziyevo
 Kreshchenka
 Kudashevo
 Kulayevo
 Kushmanakovo
 Kutliyarovo
 Kuzbayevo
 Kyzyl-Oktyabr
 Lenin-Bulyak
 Malobadrakovo
 Maloshukshanovo
 Mamady
 Minlino
 Mullino
 Naryshevo
 Nikolayevka
 Novoaltybayevo
 Novobikmetovo
 Novokaragushevo
 Novokizganovo
 Novomustafino
 Novoshilikovo
 Novotazlarovo
 Novoyeldyakovo
 Novyye Kargaly
 Sait-Kurzya
 Saitbayevo
 Sarmashevo
 Sarsaz
 Shabayevo
 Shunyakovo
 Sibirganovo
 Silosovo
 Starobikmetovo
 Starokaragushevo
 Starokizganovo
 Starokurzya
 Staromustafino
 Starotazlarovo
 Starotukranovo
 Sulzibash
 Sumsabashevo
 Tangatarovo
 Tansyzarovo
 Taztuba
 Teplyaki
 Tugaryakovo
 Tugayevo
 Tukayevo
 Uleyevo
 Utyaganovo
 Vanysh-Alpautovo
 Varzitamak
 Vostretsovo
 Votkurzya
 Yumakayevo

Burzyansky District 
Rural localities in Burzyansky District:

 Abdulmambetovo
 Akbulatovo
 Askarovo
 Atikovo
 Baygazino
 Baynazarovo
 Bretyak
 Gadelgareyevo
 Galiakberovo
 Irgizly
 Ishdavletovo
 Islambayevo
 Kildigulovo
 Kiyekbayevo
 Kulganino
 Kurgashly
 Kutanovo
 Magadeyevo
 Maly Kipchak
 Maxyutovo
 Mindigulovo
 Muradymovo
 Nabiyevo
 Novomunasipovo
 Novomusyatovo
 Novosubkhangulovo
 Novousmanovo
 Sargaya
 Staromunasipovo
 Staromusyatovo
 Starosubkhangulovo
 Timirovo
 Verkhny Nugush
 Yaumbayevo

Buzdyaksky District 
Rural localities in Buzdyaksky District:

 Akhun
 Amirovo
 Annovka
 Arslanovo
 Bakcha
 Batyrsha-Kubovo
 Bayrash
 Biyek
 Bolshaya Ustyuba
 Buzdyak
 Chishma
 Chulpan
 Derevnya Khozyaystva Zagotskota
 Gafuri
 Idyashbash
 Ishmenevo
 Ishtiryak
 Kanly-Turkeyevo
 Karan
 Karanay
 Karanbash
 Karazirek
 Kartamak
 Kazaklar-Kubovo
 Khaziman
 Kilimovo
 Kiska-Yelga
 Kiskakulbash
 Kiyazibash
 Klyatayak
 Komsomol
 Kopey-Kubovo
 Kubyak
 Kuzeyevo
 Kuzminka
 Kyzyl-Yar
 Kyzyl-Yelga
 Mikhaylovka
 Nikolskoye
 Nizhnyaya Chatra
 Novoaktau
 Novokilimovo
 Novotavlarovo
 Novy Shigay
 Pismantamak
 Rassvet
 Sabanayevo
 Sabayevo
 Selo Saraygirovskogo otdeleniya Urtakulskogo sovkhoza
 Sergeyevka
 Sevadybashevo
 Sharbash
 Shigaykulbash
 Shlanlykulevo
 Staroaktau
 Starotavlarovo
 Stary Buzdyak
 Stary Karbash
 Stary Shigay
 Staryye Bogady
 Syrtlanovo
 Tallykulevo
 Tashlykul
 Telyakey-Kubovo
 Tugayevo
 Tuktarkul
 Tyuryushevo
 Ural
 Uranovo
 Urtakul
 Urzaybash
 Usmanovsky
 Volodarskoye
 Vostochnoye
 Voznesenka
 Yakupovo
 Yaltyrkulbash
 Yardam
 Yulduzly
 Yuraktau

Chekmagushevsky District 
Rural localities in Chekmagushevsky District:

 Ablaevo
 Akhmetovo
 Bardasly
 Baybulatovo
 Bikmetovo
 Bulgar
 Bulyakovo
 Chekmagush
 Chishma-Karan
 Chiyalikulevo
 Churtanbashevo
 Igenche
 Imyanlikulevo
 Kalmashbashevo
 Karan
 Karatalovo
 Karazirikovo
 Kargaly
 Kashakovo
 Kashkarovo
 Kavkaz
 Kinderkulevo
 Kusekeyevo
 Kyzyl-Yulduz
 Lenino
 Makarovka
 Mitro-Ayupovskoye
 Narimanovo
 Nikolayevka
 Nizhniye Karyavdy
 Novaya Murtaza
 Novobalakovo
 Novobaltachevo
 Novobashirovo
 Novobikkino
 Novoikhsanovo
 Novokalmashevo
 Novokarazirikovo
 Novokutovo
 Novopuchkakovo
 Novoresmekeyevo
 Novosemenkino
 Novosurmetovo
 Novotaynyashevo
 Novoyumranovo
 Novyye Karyavdy
 Nur
 Rapatovo
 Resmekeyevo
 Rezyapovo
 Sary-Aygyr
 Starobalakovo
 Starobashirovo
 Starobikkino
 Staroikhsanovo
 Starokalmashevo
 Staropuchkakovo
 Starosurmetovo
 Starouzmyashevo
 Staryye Chupty
 Syyryshbashevo
 Tamyanovo
 Tashkalmashevo
 Taskakly
 Taynyashevo
 Tukayevo
 Tuzlukushevo
 Urnyak
 Uybulatovo
 Verkhniye Karyavdy
 Verkhny Atash
 Yana Birde
 Yash-Kuch
 Yumashevo
 Zemeyevo

Chishminsky District 
Rural localities in Chishminsky District:

 Abrayevo
 Albeyevo
 Alexandrovka
 Alkino
 Alkino-2
 Aminevo
 Arovo
 Arslanovo
 Babikovo
 Bakhchi
 Balagushevo
 Barsuanbashevo
 Bikeyevo
 Bikkulovo
 Bilyazy
 Bishkazi
 Bochkaryovka
 Bogolyubovka
 Bogomolovka
 Boriskino
 Bulyakbashevo
 Chernigovka
 Chukrakly
 Chuvalkipovo
 Dalny
 Dim
 Dmitriyevka
 Dmitriyevka
 Durasovo
 Dyoma
 Ekaterinoslavka
 Gorny
 Ibragimovo
 Ignatovka
 Ilkashevo
 Irek
 Isakovka
 Kakhnovka
 Kalmashevo
 Kara-Yakupovo
 Karamaly
 Karan-Yelga
 Kavetka
 Klyashevo
 Klyucharyovo
 Krasny Oktyabr
 Kuchumovo
 Kushkuak
 Kuzminka
 Kyzylga
 Lentovka
 Leonidovka
 Lomonosovo
 Marusino
 Nizhnekhozyatovo
 Nizhniye Termy
 Nizhny
 Novaya
 Novoabdullino
 Novokiyevka
 Novomikhaylovka
 Novomusino
 Novosafarovo
 Novosayranovo
 Novotroitskoye
 Novouptino
 Novousmanovo
 Novy Berkadak
 Novye Yabalakly
 Pasyakovka
 Penza
 Pervomaysky
 Petryayevo
 Repyevka
 Romanovka
 Saburovo
 Safarovo
 Salikhovo
 Sanzharovka
 Sayranovo
 Selo sanatoriya Alkino
 Semyonovka
 Sharapovka
 Shingak-Kul
 Slak
 Srednekhozyatovo
 Sredneusmanovo
 Staromusino
 Teperishevo
 Udryak
 Urazbakhty
 Uzytamak
 Verkhnekhozyatovo
 Verkhniye Termy
 Verkhny
 Vishnevka
 Yabalakly
 Yashikey
 Yengalyshevo
 Yeremeyevo
 Zavodyanka
 Zubovo

Davlekanovsky District 
Rural localities in Davlekanovsky District:

 Akhunovo
 Alexandrovka
 Alga
 Alga
 Almetovo
 Ayukhanovo
 Bakhcha
 Balto-Ivanovka
 Batraki
 Berezovka
 Bik-Karmaly
 Bishkain
 Burangulovo
 Chapayevo
 Chernigovka
 Chuyunchi
 Chuyunchi-Nikolayevka
 Doroshevka
 Druzhba
 Dyurtyuli
 Faridunovka
 Filippovka
 Gorchaki
 Gumerovo
 Imay-Karmaly
 Iskandarovo
 Ismagilovo
 Ivangorod
 Ivanovka
 Kadyrgulovo
 Kalinovka
 Kamchalytamak
 Karanbash
 Karatal
 Kazangulovo
 Khotimlya
 Khusainovo
 Kidryachevo
 Kirovo
 Komintern
 Komsomolsky
 Krasnaya Polyana
 Kupoyarovo
 Kuryatmasovo
 Kuzminovka
 Leninsky
 Mikhaylovka
 Mikyashevo
 Musagitovo
 Novoakkulayevo
 Novoivanovka
 Novomryasovo
 Novosharipovo
 Novoyanbekovo
 Novoyapparovo
 Olgovka
 Politotdel
 Polyakovka
 Rassvet
 Raush
 Rayevo
 Romanovka
 Rublyovka
 Sergiopol
 Shestayevo
 Shestopalovka
 Sidorovka
 Sokolovka
 Starokurmankeyevo
 Staromryasovo
 Starosharipovo
 Staroyapparovo
 Sultanovka
 Tambovka
 Tashly-Sharipovo
 Tashlytamak
 Tavrichanka
 Tuksanbay
 Urtatau
 Volynka
 Voroshilovo
 Vperyod
 Vyazovka
 Yangi-Turmush
 Yapar-Yanbekovo
 Yaskain
 Zarya

Duvansky District 
Rural localities in Duvansky District:

 Abdrashitovo
 Anzyak
 Ariyevo
 Burtsevka
 Chertan
 Duvan
 Gladkikh
 Ignashkino
 Kadyrovo
 Kalmash
 Karakulevo
 Komsomolsky
 Koshelevka
 Kutrasovka
 Lemazy
 Marzhangulovo
 Matavla
 Mesyagutovo
 Meteli
 Mikhaylovka
 Mitrofanovka
 Mulkatovo
 Nizhneye Absalyamovo
 Novokhalilovo
 Novomikhaylovka
 Oktyabrsky
 Ozero
 Pobeda
 Potapovka
 Rukhtino
 Safonovka
 Salyevka
 Semerikovka
 Sikiyaz
 Starokhalilovo
 Tastuba
 Ulkundy
 Ust-Ayaz
 Ust-Yuguz
 Verkhneye Absalyamovo
 Voznesenka
 Yaroslavka
 Yelantub
 Yezhovka
 Zaimka

Dyurtyulinsky District 
Rural localities in Dyurtyulinsky District:

 Akaneyevo
 Angasyak
 Argamak
 Argysh
 Asyanovo
 Atachevo
 Atsuyarovo
 Ayukashevo
 Bargata
 Bargyzbash
 Baygildy
 Bishnarat
 Cherlak
 Chishma
 Eldyak
 Gublyukuchukovo
 Gulyukovo
 Ildus
 Imay-Utarovo
 Iskush
 Ismailovo
 Ivachevo
 Ivanayevo
 Kaishevo
 Karalachuk
 Kazaklarovo
 Kazy-Yeldyak
 Kirgizki
 Kuchergich
 Kukkuyanovo
 Kushulevo
 Malobishkurazovo
 Mamadalevo
 Manyazybash
 Mayadyk
 Minishty
 Moskovo
 Nazitamak
 Nizhnealkashevo
 Nizhneatashevo
 Nizhnekargino
 Nizhnemancharovo
 Novobadrakovo
 Novobiktovo
 Novoishmetovo
 Novokangyshevo
 Novourtayevo
 Novy Ural
 Pokrovka
 Sabanayevo
 Salparovo
 Semiletka
 Sergeyevka
 Sikalikul
 Starobaishevo
 Starobaltachevo
 Starokangyshevo
 Starosultanbekovo
 Starourtayevo
 Staroyantuzovo
 Sukkulovo
 Sultanbekovo
 Takarlikovo
 Tamakovo
 Tarasovka
 Tash-Yelga
 Tashtau
 Taubash-Badrakovo
 Taymurzino
 Turbek
 Uchpili
 Urman-Asty
 Uspenovka
 Utkineyevo
 Uyady
 Venetsiya
 Verkhnealkashevo
 Verkhnekargino
 Veyalochnaya
 Yukalikul
 Yukalikulevo
 Yuntiryak
 Yusupovo
 Zeylevo
 Zitembyak

Fyodorovsky District 
Rural localities in Fyodorovsky District

 Akbulatovo
 Alyoshkino
 Atyashevo
 Aytugan-Durasovo
 Bala-Chetyrman
 Balykly
 Balyklybashevo
 Batyrovo
 Bazelevo
 Bulyakay
 Dedovo
 Deniskino
 Fyodorovka
 Gavrilovka
 Gavrilovka
 Gogolevka
 Goncharovka
 Gorokhovka
 Gritsayevka
 Gumbetovo
 Ilyinovka
 Ilyinovka
 Ishmukhametovo
 Ivanovka
 Izhbulyak
 Karalachik
 Kazanka
 Kiryushkino
 Klyuchevka
 Kuzminovka
 Lvovka
 Maganevka
 Mikhaylovka
 Nikolayevka
 Nizhny Alyshtan
 Novaya Derevnya
 Novomikhaylovka
 Novonikolayevka
 Novosofiyevka
 Novosyolka
 Novotroitskoye
 Novoyaushevo
 Orlovka
 Petrovka
 Petrovka
 Pokrovka
 Polynovka
 Russky Sukhoy Izyak
 Saitovo
 Sashino
 Sergeyevka
 Staronikolayevka
 Stary Chetyrman
 Tatarsky Sukhoy Izyak
 Tenyayevo
 Ulyadarovka
 Verkhneyaushevo
 Verkhny Alyshtan
 Verkhnyaya Mityukovka
 Veselovka
 Yuldashevo
 Yurkovka
 Yurmaty
 Zlatoustovka

Gafuriysky District 
Rural localities in Gafuriysky District:

 Abdullino
 Akhmetka
 Aktashevo
 Antonovka
 Arkhangelskoye
 Baimbetovo
 Bakrak
 Bazikovo
 Beloozyorovka
 Beloye Ozero
 Bely Kamen
 Berezovka
 Bolshoy Utyash
 Burly
 Burunovka
 Daryino
 Derevnya pchelosovkhoza
 Dmitriyevka
 Dmitriyevka
 Ibragimovo
 Igenchekyar
 Iktisad
 Imendyashevo
 Imyannik
 Inzelga
 Ivanovka
 Karagayevo
 Karan-Yelga
 Karly
 Kovardy
 Krasnodubrovsk
 Krasnousolsky
 Krasny Oktyabr
 Kulkanovo
 Kurgashla
 Kurmantau
 Kurorta
 Kutluguza
 Kuzma-Alexandrovka
 Kyzyl Yar
 Lugovaya
 Maly Utyash
 Mendim
 Mikhaylovka
 Mrakovo
 Muraz
 Nekrasovka
 Nizhny Tashbukan
 Novaya Aldashla
 Novokaramyshevo
 Novosemyonovka
 Novotaishevo
 Novotroyevka
 Novozirikovo
 Novyye Burly
 Novyye Kovardy
 Noyabrevka
 Pavlovka
 Petropavlovka
 Pobeda
 Rodina
 Russky Saskul
 Sabayevo
 Saitbaba
 Sofyino
 Sredny Utyash
 Sukhodol
 Tabynskoye
 Taishevo
 Tash-Asty
 Tashla
 Tatarsky Saskul
 Tolparovo
 Tsapalovka
 Tugay
 Tugayevo
 Ural
 Usmanovo
 Utyakovo
 Uvarovka
 Uzbyakovo
 Verkhny Tashbukan
 Voinovka
 Yakty-Kul
 Yangiskain
 Yavgildy
 Yulukovo
 Yurmash
 Yuzimanovo
 Zarechny
 Zilim-Karanovo
 Zirikly
 Zirikovo

Iglinsky District 
Rural localities in Iglinsky District:

 Akberdino
 Alatorka
 Amirovo
 Amitovo
 Ashinsky
 Askanysh
 Austrum
 Avangard
 Balazhi
 Baltika
 Barantsevo
 Beloretsk
 Bibakhtino
 Blokhino
 Bogdanovskoye
 Bratsky
 Budennovsky
 Bulan-Turgan
 Chkalovskoye
 Chuvash-Kubovo
 Chyorny Klyuch
 Fatkullino
 Frunze
 Iglino
 Iskra
 Ivano-Kazanka
 Kalininskoye
 Kalininsky
 Kaltovka
 Kaltymanovo
 Karamaly
 Kazayak
 Kazayak-Khusnullino
 Kazayak-Kutush
 Kirovskoye
 Kirovsky
 Klyashevo
 Klyuchevskoye
 Kommunar
 Krasny Klyuch
 Krasny Voskhod
 Krasny Yar
 Kudeyevsky
 Kurshaki
 Kushkul
 Kuznetsovka
 Lemeza
 Leninskoye
 Leninskoye
 Leninsky
 Malaya Ashinka
 Managora
 Maysky
 Mikhaylovka
 Minzitarovo
 Monchazy
 Nizhniye Lemezy
 Novaya Beryozovka
 Novobakayevo
 Novokubovo
 Novosimskoye
 Novotroitskoye
 Novoufimsk
 Novy
 Okhlebinino
 Oktyabrskoye
 Oktyabrsky
 Olginskoye
 Orlovka
 Pervomayskoye
 Peschano-Lobovo
 Petrovo-Fedorovka
 Petrovskoye
 Podolsky
 Pokrovka
 Postupalovo
 Preobrazhenka
 Preobrazhenskaya
 Pushkinskoye
 Pyatiletka
 Pyatiletka
 Rasmikeyevo
 Rassvet
 Rezvovo
 Rodniki
 Sart-Lobovo
 Shaksha
 Shelany
 Shipovo
 Shukteyevo
 Simskoye
 Slutka
 Sotsialistichesky
 Spasskoye
 Staraya Kudeyevka
 Starokubovo
 Stary Yurmash
 Staryye Karashidy
 Subakayevo
 Tashly-Yelga
 Tau
 Taush
 Tavtimanovo
 Tikeyevo
 Turbasly
 Tyulko-Tamak
 Ukteyevo
 Ulu-Karamaly
 Ulu-Telyak
 Ulu-Yelan
 Urman
 Urozhay
 Urunda
 Ustyugovka
 Verny
 Vesyoly
 Voroshilovskoye
 Voznesenka
 Vysokaya
 Yagodnaya
 Yasnaya Polyana
 Yeleninsky
 Yuremis-Nadezhdinskoye
 Zagorskoye
 Zavety Ilyicha

Ilishevsky District 
Rural localities in Ilishevsky District:

 Abdullino
 Akkuzevo
 Anachevo
 Andreyevka
 Ashmanovo
 Baza-Kuyanovo
 Bazitamak
 Bishkurayevo
 Bulyak
 Buraly
 Chuy-Atasevo
 Dyumeyevo
 Gremuchy Klyuch
 Gremuchy Klyuch
 Gruzdevka
 Ibragim
 Igmetovo
 Ilishevo
 Ilyakshide
 Irmashevo
 Isametovo
 Isanbayevo
 Ishkarovo
 Ishteryakovo
 Iteyevo
 Kadyrovo
 Kalinino
 Karabashevo
 Kayenlyk
 Kipchakovo
 Knyaz-Yelga
 Krasnoyarovo
 Krasny Oktyabr
 Kuzhbakhty
 Kyzyl-Bayrak
 Kyzyl-Kuch
 Kyzyl-Yulduz
 Layashty
 Lena
 Malo-Bishkurayevo
 Malotazeyevo
 Mari-Meneuz
 Marino
 Nizhnecherekulevo
 Nizhneyarkeyevo
 Novoatashevo
 Novokuktovo
 Novomedvedevo
 Novonadyrovo
 Rsayevo
 Saitkulovo
 Shammetovo
 Shidali
 Starobiktovo
 Starokirgizovo
 Starokuktovo
 Staronadyrovo
 Starotatyshevo
 Syngryanovo
 Syultino
 Tashchishma
 Tashkichi
 Tatarsky Meneuz
 Tazeyevo
 Telekeyevo
 Telepanovo
 Tukay-Tamak
 Tupeyevo
 Turachi
 Tyuliganovo
 Ulu-Yalan
 Urmetovo
 Urnyakovo
 Uyandykovo
 Verkhnecherekulevo
 Verkhnemancharovo
 Verkhneyarkeyevo
 Verkhneye Yuldashevo
 Vostok
 Votsky Meneuz
 Yabalakovo
 Yantuganovo
 Yunny
 Zyaylevo

Ishimbaysky District 
Rural localities in Ishimbaysky District:

 Akhmerovo
 Alakayevo
 Almaly
 Anikeyevsky
 Aptikovo
 Arlarovo
 Armetrakhimovo
 Asiyalan
 Avangard
 Aznayevo
 Bayguzino
 Berdyshla
 Biksyanovo
 Bogdanovka
 Bolshebaikovo
 Gumerovo
 Ibrayevo
 Isheyevo
 Ishimovo
 Iskisyakovo
 Isyakayevo
 Kabyasovo
 Kalmakovo
 Kalu-Ayry
 Kanakayevo
 Karasyovka
 Karayganovo
 Kashalakbash
 Khazinovo
 Kinzebulatovo
 Kinzekeyevo
 Kiyaukovo
 Kozlovsky
 Kulgunino
 Kuznetsovsky
 Kuzyanovo
 Kyzyl Oktyabr
 Kyzyl-Yulduz
 Lesnoye
 Makarovo
 Malobaikovo
 Malomaksyutovo
 Mikhaylovka
 Mikhaylovka
 Nizhnearmetovo
 Novoaptikovo
 Novogeorgiyevka
 Novoivanovka
 Novonikolayevka
 Novosaitovo
 Oktyabr
 Osipovka
 Pavlovka
 Petrovskoye
 Podgorny
 Podlesny
 Romadanovka
 Salikhovo
 Sargayevo
 Sayranovo
 Shikhan
 Skvorchikha
 Slobodka
 Solyony
 Starosaitovo
 Tatyanovka
 Timashevka
 Torgaska
 Urazbayevo
 Urman-Bishkadak
 Urnyak
 Vasilyevka
 Verkhnearmetovo
 Verkhneitkulovo
 Verkhotor
 Vostok
 Yaltaran
 Yangi-Aul
 Yangi-Yurt
 Yanurusovo
 Yar-Bishkadak
 Yasheltau
 Yekaterinovka
 Yuldashevo
 Ziganovka

Kaltasinsky District 
Rural localities in Kaltasinsky District:

 Akineyevo
 Aktuganovo
 Alexandrovka
 Amzibash
 Babayevo
 Barsukovo
 Baryaza
 Bolshekachakovo
 Bolshekurazovo
 Bolshetuganeyevo
 Bolshoy Keltey
 Bratovshchina
 Buraly
 Chashkino
 Chilibeyevo
 Chumara
 Gareyevka
 Grafskoye
 Ilchibay
 Kachkinturay
 Kalegino
 Kalmash
 Kalmiyabash
 Kaltasy
 Kangulovo
 Kiyebak
 Kokush
 Koyanovo
 Kozloyalovo
 Krasnokholmsky
 Krasny Kholm
 Krasny Yar
 Kuchash
 Kugarchino
 Kurgak
 Kushnya
 Kuterem
 Kuyanovo
 Kyrpy
 Malokachakovo
 Malokurazovo
 Mariysky Bikshik
 Nadezhdino
 Naratovo
 Nizhny Kachmash
 Nizhny Tykhtem
 Norkino
 Novokilbakhtino
 Novotokranovo
 Novoyashevo
 Novy Amzibash
 Novy Ashit
 Novy Atkul
 Novy Oryebash
 Rodniki
 Saulyashbash
 Sazovo
 Semyonkino
 Sharipovo
 Sredny Kachmash
 Staroturayevo
 Staroyashevo
 Stary Oryebash
 Staryye Kaltasy
 Sultanayevo
 Tat-Bikshik
 Toykino
 Tynbakhtino
 Tyuldi
 U-Yal
 Vanyshevo
 Vasilovo
 Vasilyevo
 Verkhny Kachmash
 Verkhny Tykhtem
 Yasnaya Polyana

Karaidelsky District 
Rural localities in Karaidelsky District:

 Abdullino
 Abutalipovo
 Abyzovo
 Alexandrovka
 Aminevo
 Arkaul
 Artakul
 Askish
 Atamanovka
 Atnyash
 Atnyashkino
 Bartym
 Bayki
 Bayki-Yunusovo
 Baykibashevo
 Bazilevsky
 Berdyash
 Biyaz
 Burkhanovka
 Chapash
 Chebykovo
 Chemayevo
 Davlyatovka
 Deushevo
 Dubrovka
 Dyurtyuli
 Gornoye
 Imyanovo
 Itkuli
 Kadysi
 Kainchak
 Kaltasy
 Kanton
 Karaidel
 Karayar
 Karysh-Yelga
 Khalilovo
 Khoroshayevo
 Kirzya
 Komsomolsky
 Krasny Uryush
 Krush
 Kurtlykul
 Kuyanchi
 Maginsk
 Malikovo
 Mata
 Mryasimovo
 Mullkayevo
 Nagretdinovo
 Nikolo-Kazanka
 Nizhniye Balmazy
 Nizhny Suyan
 Novomullakayevo
 Novosyolka
 Novoyansaitovo
 Novy Akbulyak
 Novy Berdyash
 Oktyabrsky
 Ozerki
 Podlubovo
 Poperechnaya Gora
 Razdolye
 Sabankul
 Sedyash
 Sedyash-Nagayevo
 Shamratovo
 Shaushak
 Sosnovy Bor
 Starootkustino
 Stary Akbulyak
 Staryye Bagazy
 Suleymanovo
 Surda
 Suyundyukovo
 Tat-Kudash
 Tatarsky Uryush
 Tayga
 Taykash
 Tegermenevo
 Teter-Klyuch
 Turnovo
 Tuyushevo
 Urazayevo
 Urazbakhty
 Urgush
 Uryush-Bitullino
 Ust-Bartaga
 Ust-Sukhoyaz
 Verkhny Suyan
 Yakupovo
 Yanbak
 Yanbatyrovka
 Yavgildino
 Yuldashevo
 Yuryuzan
 Zinatovka
 Zuyevka

Karmaskalinsky District 
Rural localities in Karmaskalinsky District:

 Abdullino
 Advokatovka
 Adzitarovo
 Akkul
 Aksakovo
 Aktyuba
 Alaygirovo
 Alexandrovka
 Alexandrovka
 Alexeyevka
 Almalyk
 Antonovka
 Arslanovo
 Baltino
 Beketovo
 Belsky
 Beryozovka
 Bishaul-Ungarovo
 Bochkaryovka
 Bulyakay
 Buzovyazbash
 Buzovyazy
 Chishma
 Derevnya razyezda Ibragimovo
 Derevnya stantsii Kabakovo
 Derevnya stantsii Sakharozavodskaya
 Dmitriyevka
 Georgiyevka
 Grachyovka
 Ibragimovo
 Ilteryakovo
 Iltuganovo
 Ivanovka
 Kabakovo
 Kachevan
 Kalmovka
 Kamyshlinka
 Karakul
 Karlaman
 Karlamanbash
 Karmaskaly
 Konstantinovka
 Krasnoyarovo
 Kullyarovo
 Kulushevo
 Kushkul
 Kustugulovo
 Kuyashkino
 Lyakhovo
 Malayevo
 Matrosovka
 Mikhaylovka
 Mukayevo
 Muksinovo
 Mursyakovo
 Murzino
 Naberezhny
 Nikiforovka
 Nikitino
 Nikolayevka
 Nizhnetimkino
 Nizhny Tyukun
 Novoaktashevo
 Novoalexeyevka
 Novoandreyevka
 Novobabichevo
 Novokazanka
 Novomusino
 Novomusino
 Novopetrovka
 Novotroitsk
 Novy Bishaul
 Novy Kuganak
 Novyye Kiyeshki
 Oktyabr
 Orlovka
 Podlubovo
 Pokrovka
 Pribelsky
 Rakitovka
 Romanovka
 Sakhayevo
 Salzigutovo
 Sarsaz
 Sart-Chishma
 Sart-Nauruzovo
 Savaleyevo
 Sharipkulovo
 Shaymuratovo
 Sikhonkino
 Simsky
 Smolenka
 Staroaktashevo
 Staroalexeyevka
 Starobabichevo
 Staromusino
 Staroshareyevo
 Staroyanbekovo
 Staryye Kiyeshki
 Sulu-Kuak
 Suuk-Chishma
 Syskanovo
 Tansaitovo
 Tausengirovo
 Tazlarovo
 Tubyak-Tazlarovo
 Ulukulevo
 Ulyanovka
 Ural
 Utyaganovo
 Varshavka
 Verkhnetimkino
 Verkhneuglichino
 Verkhny Tyukun
 Vyazovka
 Yakovlevka
 Yakty-Kul
 Yakty-Yalan
 Yefremkino
 Yelizavetino

Khaybullinsky District 
Rural localities in Khaybullinsky District:

 1st Murzino
 Abdulnasyrovo
 Abubakirovo
 Adel
 Aknazarovo
 Aktashevo
 Akyar
 Akyulovo
 Alibayevskoye
 Antingan
 Bakalovka
 Bayguskarovo
 Bolsheabishevo
 Bolshearslangulovo
 Buribay
 Buzavlyk
 Galiakhmetovo
 Ilyachevo
 Isyangildino
 Ivanovka
 Komsomolsk
 Makan
 Maloarslangulovo
 Mambetovo
 Mikhaylovka
 Nizhneismakovo
 Novopetrovskoye
 Novopetrovskoye
 Novoukrainka
 Novy Zirgan
 Perevolochan
 Pervomayskoye
 Petropavlovsky
 Podolsk
 Pugachyovo
 Rafikovo
 Sadovy
 Sagitovo
 Sakmar-Nazargulovo
 Samarskoye
 Savelyevka
 Stepnoy
 Tanatar
 Tashtugay
 Tatyr-Uzyak
 Ufimsky
 Urazbayevo
 Urnyak
 Valitovo
 Vozdvizhenka

Kiginsky District 
Rural localities in Kiginsky District:

 Abdrezyakovo
 Abzaevo
 Alaguzovo
 Arslanovo
 Asylguzhino
 Dushanbekovo
 Ibrayevo
 Idrisovo
 Igenchelyar
 Kandakovka
 Kiseik
 Kizetamak
 Kulbakovo
 Kulmetovo
 Kurgashevo
 Leuza
 Masyakovo
 Nizhniye Kigi
 Novomukhametovo
 Oktyabr
 Parizh
 Pervomaysky
 Sagirovo
 Saragulovo
 Staromukhametovo
 Sultanovka
 Syurbayevo
 Tuguzly
 Tukayevo
 Tyoply Klyuch
 Urak
 Vakiyarovo
 Verkhniye Kigi
 Vyazovka
 Yagunovo
 Yelanlino
 Yukalikulevo
 Yunusovo
 Yusupovo

Krasnokamsky District 
Rural localities in Krasnokamsky District:

 Apasevo
 Arlan
 Ashit
 Bachkitau
 Baryazibash
 Biktimirovo
 Bolshaya Amzya
 Burnyush
 Chabayevka
 Derevnya Sharipovskogo uchastka
 Ilistanbetovo
 Ishmetovo
 Ivanovka
 Kadrekovo
 Kaltayevo
 Kariyevo
 Karyakino
 Kiremetovo
 Kirgizovo
 Kuperbash
 Kutlinka
 Kuvakino
 Kuyanovo
 Kuzgovo
 Manyak
 Mozhary
 Mryasovo
 Murzino
 Muzyak
 Nikolo-Beryozovka
 Nikolskoye
 Nizhnyaya Tatya
 Novaya Bura
 Novaya Mushta
 Novobaltachevo
 Novokabanovo
 Novokhazino
 Novonagayevo
 Novourazayevo
 Novy Aktanyshbash
 Novy Burtyuk
 Novy Chuganak
 Novy Kainlyk
 Novy Tatysh
 Novy Yanzigit
 Razdolye
 Redkino
 Sabanchi
 Saklovo
 Sauzbash
 Sauzovo
 Shushnur
 Staraya Bura
 Staraya Mushta
 Starourazayevo
 Staroyanzigitovo
 Stary Ashit
 Stary Burtyuk
 Stary Kainlyk
 Taktalachuk
 Urtaul
 Vedreseyevo
 Vorobyovo
 Yanaul
 Yanaul
 Yanguznarat
 Yenaktayevo
 Zubovka

Kugarchinsky District 
Rural localities in Kugarchinsky District:

 1st Tukatovo
 1st Tupchanovo
 2nd Tukatovo
 Alexandrovka
 Alimgulovo
 Almyasovo
 Andreyevka
 Aralbay
 Ardatovo
 Aygay-Mursalay
 Aznagulovo
 Bagdashkino
 Bash-Berkutovo
 Bekechevo
 Bekeshevo
 Berkutovo
 Bikbulatovo
 Bustubayevo
 Chernigovsky
 Daut-Kayupovo
 Davletkulovo 1-ye
 Davletshinsky
 Gavrilovka
 Gavrilovsky
 Gazis
 Ibragimovo
 Ibrayevo
 Igubayevo
 Iknazarovo
 Irtyubyak
 Isimovo
 Izhberdino
 Kadyrovo
 Kaldarovo
 Kanakachevo
 Karan
 Kaskinovo
 Khlebodarovka
 Khudayberdino
 Kirova
 Krasny Yar
 Kugarchi
 Kurt-Yelga
 Kuzminovka
 Kyzyltash
 Leonovsky
 Maloisimovo
 Maxyutovo
 Mrakovo
 Mryaushlinsky
 Mukachevo
 Muradym
 Musino
 Narbutovo
 Nazarkino
 Nizhnebikkuzino
 Nizhnesapashevo
 Nizhnesyuryubayevo
 Nizhneye Sazovo
 Nizhnyaya Mayka
 Novokhvalynsky
 Novonikolayevskoye
 Novopetrovskoye
 Novopokrovskoye
 Novosapashevo
 Nukayevo
 Petropavlovka
 Poboishche
 Podgornoye
 Progress
 Saitkulovo
 Salikhovo
 Sapykovo
 Saratovsky
 Satlyki
 Semirechye
 Semyono-Pokrovskoye
 Serp i Molot
 Shcherbaki
 Siksanbayevo
 Simbirsky
 Staro-Almyasovo
 Starokhvalynsky
 Sultangulovo
 Syuren
 Tangaur
 Tavakanovo
 Tlyaumbetovo
 Tuyembetovo
 Tyulebayevo
 Tyulyabayevo
 Ulutup
 Urakayevo
 Valitovo
 Vasilyevsky
 Verkhnebikkuzino
 Verkhnemursalyayevo
 Verkhnesanzyapovo
 Verkhnesyuryubayevo
 Verkhneye Sazovo
 Volostnovka
 Voskresenskoye
 Yadgarovo
 Yakshimbetovo
 Yalchino
 Yalchino
 Yanaul
 Yetebulak
 Yulbashevo
 Yuldybay
 Yumaguzino
 Zireklya

Kumertau 
Rural localities in Kumertau urban okrug:

 Alexeyevka
 Ira
 Mayachny

Kushnarenkovsky District 
Rural localities in Kushnarenkovsky District:

 Akhlystino
 Akhmetovo
 Akhta
 Bakayevo
 Bardovka
 Baytally
 Beykeyevo
 Chirsha-Tartysh
 Derevnya Uchkhoza selkhoztekhnikuma
 Gorny
 Gumerovo
 Gurgureyevo
 Gurovka
 Ibragimovo
 Ilikovo
 Ilmurzino
 Islanovo
 Kaltayevo
 Kanly
 Karacha-Yelga
 Karatyaki
 Kazarma
 Kerenyovo
 Kudushlibashevo
 Kupayevo
 Kushnarenkovo
 Kuvykovo
 Kyzylkuper
 Mamyakovo
 Mars
 Matveyevo
 Mavlyutovo
 Medvedyorovo
 Nizhneakbashevo
 Nizhnesaitovo
 Novoakbashevo
 Novobakayevo
 Novobaskakovo
 Novogumerovo
 Novokurmashevo
 Novyye Kamyshly
 Novyye Tukmakly
 Pervushino
 Petropavlovo
 Rasmekeyevo
 Saitovo
 Sharipovo
 Sredneakbashevo
 Staraya Murtaza
 Starobaskakovo
 Starogumerovo
 Starokurmashevo
 Staroyumranovo
 Staryye Kamyshly
 Staryye Tukmakly
 Subay
 Sultanayevo
 Syultyup
 Taganayevo
 Taraberdino
 Tolbazy
 Uguzevo
 Ural
 Verkhneakbashevo
 Verkhnesaitovo
 Voyetskoye
 Yakupovo
 Yamskoye
 Yaparka

Kuyurgazinsky District 
Rural localities in Kuyurgazinsky District:

 Abdulovo
 Aksarovo
 Alexandrovsky
 Annovka
 Arslano-Amekachevo
 Aysuak
 Bakhmut
 Balza
 Bugulchan
 Dedovsky
 Gorny Klyuch
 Ilkineyevo
 Ivanovka
 Kanchura
 Karagay
 Karayevo
 Kholmogory
 Kholodny Klyuch
 Kovalyovka
 Krasny Mayak
 Krasny Vostok
 Krivle-Ilyushkino
 Kunakbayevo
 Kutluyulovo
 Kuyurgazy
 Kuznetsovsky
 Kyzyl-Mayak
 Lena
 Malomusino
 Mambetkulovo
 Maryevka
 Mikhaylovka
 Molokanovo
 Muraptal
 Mutal
 Nizhneye Babalarovo
 Novaya Otrada
 Novaya Uralka
 Novoallaberdino
 Novokaltayevo
 Novomikhaylovka
 Novomuraptalovo
 Novomusino
 Novotaymasovo
 Novotroitskaya
 Novoyadgarovskaya
 Novoyamashevo
 Olkhovka
 Pavlovka
 Pchyolka
 Pokrovka
 Raznomoyka
 Samartsevo
 Sandin 2-y
 Sandin
 Savelyevka
 Shabagish
 Sredneye Babalarovo
 Staraya Otrada
 Staromuraptalovo
 Surakayevo
 Svoboda
 Taymasovo
 Timerbayevo
 Tyukanovo 2-ye
 Ulyanovka
 Verkhneye Babalarovo
 Yakshimbetovo
 Yakupovo
 Yakutovo
 Yalchikayevo
 Yamangulovo
 Yamansarovo
 Yangi-Aul
 Yangi-Yul
 Yazlav
 Yegoryevka
 Yermolayevo
 Yumaguzino
 Yushatyrka
 Znamenka
 Zyak-Ishmetovo

Mechetlinsky District 
Rural localities in Mechetlinsky District:

 Abdrakhimovo
 Abdullino
 Alegazovo
 Ay
 Ayupovo
 Azangulovo
 Azikeyevo
 Bolshaya Oka
 Bolshekyzylbayevo
 Bolsheustyikinskoye
 Buranchino
 Burgadzhino
 Burtakovka
 Duvan-Mechetlino
 Gumerovo
 Ishalino
 Karanayevo
 Klyuchevoy
 Kurgatovo
 Kurshalino
 Kutashevo
 Lemez-Tamak
 Malokyzylbayevo
 Maloustyinskoye
 Melekasovo
 Nizhneye Bobino
 Nizhneye Tukbayevo
 Novomeshcherovo
 Novomuslyumovo
 Novoyaushevo
 Oktyabrsk
 Sabanakovo
 Salzigutovo
 Sosnovka
 Srednyaya Oka
 Staromeshcherovo
 Stepnoy
 Suleymanovo
 Taishevo
 Takino
 Telyashevo
 Timirbayevo
 Timiryakovo
 Verkhneye Bobino
 Yasinovo
 Yelanysh
 Yulayevo
 Yunusovo
 Zhvakino

Meleuzovsky District 
Rural localities in Meleuzovsky District:

 Abitovo
 Aknazarovo
 Alexandrovka
 Andreyevsky
 Antonovka
 Apasovo
 Aptrakovo
 Araslanovo
 Aytugan
 Basurmanovka
 Belsky
 Beregovka
 Beryozovsky
 Bogorodskoye
 Danilovka
 Daryino
 Davletkulovo
 Dmitriyevka
 Dmitriyevka
 Ishtuganovo
 Islamgulovo
 Itkuchukovo
 Ivanovka
 Karan
 Kashalya
 Khasanovo
 Khlebodarovka
 Kizray
 Klimovka
 Kochkar
 Konarevka
 Korneyevka
 Krasnogorsky
 Krasny Yar
 Kutlubulatovo
 Kutushevo
 Kuzminskoye
 Malomukachevo
 Malosharipovo
 Mikhaylovka
 Mullagulovo
 Mutayevo
 Nizhnetashevo
 Nordovka
 Novaya Kazanovka
 Novaya Slobodka
 Novotroyevka
 Nugush
 Nurdavletovo
 Ozerki
 Pervomayskaya
 Petropavlovka
 Petrovsky
 Pokrovka
 Rassvet
 Romadanovka
 Romanovka
 Sabashevo
 Saitovsky
 Samaro-Ivanovka
 Samarovka
 Samoylovka
 Sarlak
 Saryshevo
 Semyonovka
 Sergeyevka
 Seryat
 Smakovo
 Staraya Kazanovka
 Staromusino
 Stolyarovka
 Sukharevka
 Syrtlanovo
 Tamyan
 Tashlykul
 Terekla
 Tikhonovka
 Troitskoye
 Tumachino
 Tyulyakovo
 Uzya
 Varvarino
 Vasilyevka
 Verkhneyuldashevo
 Voskresenskoye
 Vostochny
 Yakty-Kul
 Yangy-Aul
 Yumakovo
 Zirgan
 Zirikovo

Mishkinsky District 
Rural localities in Mishkinsky District:

 Andreyevka
 Babayevo
 Bash-Baybakovo
 Baymurzino
 Bayturovo
 Bikshikovo
 Biryubash
 Bolshesukhoyazovo
 Bolshiye Shady
 Buklendy
 Chebykovo
 Churayevo
 Ilikovo
 Irsayevo
 Ishimovo
 Ishtybayevo
 Izimarino
 Kalmazan
 Kameyevo
 Karasimovo
 Kargino
 Kayrakovo
 Kigazytamakovo
 Kochkildino
 Krasny Klyuch
 Kreshchenskoye
 Kurmanayevo
 Kyzyl-Yul
 Leninskoye
 Lepeshkino
 Levitsky
 Malonakaryakovo
 Malyye Shady
 Mavlyutovo
 Mayevka
 Mishkino
 Mitryayevo
 Nizhnesorokino
 Novoakbulatovo
 Novokarachevo
 Novokilmetovo
 Novoklyuchevo
 Novonikolayevka
 Novosafarovo
 Novotroitskoye
 Novovaskino
 Oktyabr
 Ozerki
 Rayevka
 Refandy
 Russkoye Baybakovo
 Sabayevo
 Sosnovka
 Staroakbulatovo
 Staroarzamatovo
 Staroatnagulovo
 Starokulchubayevo
 Staronakaryakovo
 Starovaskino
 Tatarbayevo
 Terekeyevo
 Tigirmenevo
 Toktarovo
 Tynbayevo
 Ukozyash
 Uryady
 Verkhnesorokino
 Voskhod
 Yanagushevo
 Yandyganovo
 Yelyshevo
 Yubaykulevo

Miyakinsky District 
Rural localities in Miyakinsky District:

 2nd Miyakibashevo
 Abishevo
 Aitovo
 Akyar
 Alexeyevka
 Andreyevka
 Anyasevo
 Bayazitovo
 Baytimirovo
 Bikkulovo
 Bogdanovo
 Bolshiye Karkaly
 Chayka
 Chetyrbash
 Chiryashtamak
 Chishmy
 Chiyale
 Chulpan
 Churayevo
 Chyatay-Burzyan
 Dneprovka
 Dubrovka
 Ikhtisad
 Ilchigulovo
 Islamgulovo
 Kacheganovo
 Kamyshly
 Kanbekovo
 Karan-Kunkas
 Karyshevo
 Kashkarovo
 Keken-Vasilyevka
 Kirgiz-Miyaki
 Komsomolsky
 Kozhay-Semyonovka
 Kul-Kanas
 Kultay-Karan
 Kurmanaybash
 Kyzyl-Chishma
 Malyye Gayny
 Malyye Karkaly
 Maximovka
 Mayak
 Meneuztamak
 Miyakitamak
 Narystau
 Nikolayevka
 Nikolskoye
 Novoalexeyevka
 Novofyodorovka
 Novomikhaylovka
 Novonikolayevka
 Novy Mir
 Novyye Ishly
 Novyye Karmaly
 Novyye Omelniki
 Petropavlovka
 Rassvet
 Rodnikovka
 Russkoye Ursayevo
 Sadovy
 Safarovo
 Satayevo
 Satyyevo
 Sergeyevka
 Shatmantamak
 Shatra
 Smorodinovka
 Sofiyevka
 Staryye Balgazi
 Sukkul-Mikhaylovka
 Tamyan-Taymas
 Taukay-Gayna
 Timyashevo
 Tuksanbayevo
 Tuyash
 Umanka
 Urnyak
 Urshak
 Urshakbashkaramaly
 Uspekh
 Uyazybashevo
 Verkhotsenko
 Yashelkul
 Yashlyar
 Yenebey-Ursayevo
 Yerlykovo
 Zaypekul
 Zidigan
 Zildyarovo
 Zirikly
 Ziriklykul

Neftekamsk 
Rural localities in Neftekamsk urban okrug:

 Amzya
 Chishma
 Energetik
 Krym-Sarayevo
 Marino
 Tashkinovo

Nurimanovsky District 
Rural localities in Nurimanovsky District:

 Bash-Shidy
 Baygildino
 Baykal
 Bikmurzino
 Bolshetenkashevo
 Bolshiye Shidy
 Chandar
 Churashevo
 Gizyatovo
 Ishmuratovo
 Istrikovo
 Kargino
 Kaznatash
 Klyuch Bedeyevo
 Krasnaya Gorka
 Krasny Klyuch
 Kushkulevo
 Kyzyl-Barzhau
 Malotenkashevo
 Malyye Shidy
 Nikolskoye
 Nimislyarovo
 Novobedeyevo
 Novobiryuchevo
 Novoisayevo
 Novokulevo
 Novy Subay
 Nur
 Pavlovka
 Pervomaysk
 Ryatush
 Sargayazovo
 Sarva
 Satlyk
 Starobedeyevo
 Starobiryuchevo
 Staroisayevo
 Starokulevo
 Stary Biyaz
 Uraklino
 Urman
 Ust-Saldybash
 Ustye Yaman-Yelgi
 Uyankul
 Verkhnekirovsky
 Voznesensky
 Yaman-Port
 Yurmash

Salavatsky District 
Rural localities in Salavatsky District:

 1st Idelbaevo
 2nd Idelbaevo
 Akhunovo
 Alkino
 Arkaulovo
 Ayskaya
 Bash-Ilchikeyevo
 Beshevlyarovo
 Bychkovka
 Chebarkul
 Cherepanovo
 Chulpan
 Gusevka
 Idrisovo
 Iltayevo
 Ishimbayevo
 Kalmaklarovo
 Karagulovo
 Komsomol
 Kuselyarovo
 Kyzyrbak
 Lagerevo
 Lakly
 Makhmutovo
 Maloyaz
 Mechetlino
 Meshchegarovo
 Mindishevo
 Mursalimkino
 Musatovo
 Nasibash
 Novaya Mikhaylovka
 Novosyuryukayevo
 Novyye Kartavly
 Pervomaysky
 Pokrovka
 Radio
 Russkoye Ilchikeyevo
 Sargamysh
 Sharipovo
 Sharyakovo
 Svoboda
 Tashaulovo
 Tatarsky Maloyaz
 Termenevo
 Turnaly
 Urdaly
 Urmanchino
 Urmantau
 Ustyatavka
 Yakhya
 Yangatau
 Yaubulyakovo
 Yazgi-Yurt
 Yelanysh
 Yelgildino
 Yulayevo
 Yunusovo

Sharansky District 
Rural localities in Sharansky District:

 Akbarisovo
 Almash
 Alpayevo
 Anisimova Polyana
 Bakhcha
 Barsukovo
 Bazgiyevo
 Bikkulovo
 Biktyshevo
 Borisovka
 Bulansaz
 Chalmaly
 Chekan-Tamak
 Chupayevo
 Dmitriyeva Polyana
 Dyurmenevo
 Dyurtyuli
 Grigoryevka
 Imchag
 Isametovo
 Istochnik
 Izimka
 Kagarchi-Bulyak
 Karakashly
 Karazybash
 Kir-Tlyavli
 Kubalyak
 Kurtutel
 Kyzyl-Chulpan
 Meshcherovo
 Michurinsk
 Mikhaylovka
 Naratasty
 Nizhnezaitovo
 Nizhniye Tashly
 Novaya Sbrodovka
 Novoalexandrovka
 Novobaygildino
 Novobaykiyevo
 Novochikeyevo
 Novoknyazevo
 Novopetrovka
 Novotavlarovo
 Novotroitsk
 Novotumbagushevo
 Novoturbeyevo
 Novoyumashevo
 Novoyuzeyevo
 Novy Kichkinyash
 Novy Tamyan
 Novye Karyavdy
 Nureyevo
 Papanovka
 Pisarevo
 Pokrovka
 Preobrazhenskoye
 Roshcha
 Rozhdestvenka
 Sakty
 Sarsaz
 Shaltykbashevo
 Sharan
 Sharanbash-Knyazevo
 Sharlykbash
 Sokolovka
 Starochikeyevo
 Starodrazhzhevo
 Starotumbagushevo
 Staroturbeyevo
 Stary Kichkinyash
 Stary Tamyan
 Starye Tlyavli
 Sunbash
 Sungurovka
 Tallykul
 Tan
 Taran
 Tash-Chishma
 Tat-Kuchuk
 Temyakovo
 Timirovo
 Tri Klyucha
 Tugaryak
 Ukiyaz
 Ulik-Yelga
 Ursayevo
 Uyalovo
 Vasilyevka
 Verkhniye Tashly
 Vladimirovka
 Yelan-Yelga
 Yelanchikbash
 Yemmetovo
 Yenakhmetovo
 Yeremkino
 Yangaulovo
 Yumadybash
 Yunost
 Zagornye Kletya
 Zirikly

Sibay 
Rural localities in Sibay urban okrug:

 Tuyalyas

Sterlibashevsky District 
Rural localities in Sterlibashevsky District:

 Akchishma
 Amirovo
 Artyukhovka
 Aydarali
 Aytugan
 Baimovo
 Bakeyevo
 Bakhcha
 Bankovka
 Borisovka
 Bulazh
 Bulyak
 Buzat
 Chegodayevka
 Dmitriyevka
 Galey-Buzat
 Gumbazy
 Ibrakayevo
 Ivanovka
 Kabakush
 Karagush
 Karamaly-Buzat
 Karanayevo
 Karayar
 Khalikeyevo
 Kordon Lesnoy
 Korneyevka
 Kuganakbash
 Kundryak
 Kyzyl-Yar
 Lugavushka
 Maly Buzat
 Maxyutovo
 Mukhametdaminovo
 Murtaza
 Mustafino
 Nikolskoye
 Nizhneibrayevo
 Nizhneshakarovo
 Nizhniye Karamaly
 Nizhny Allaguvat
 Novoivanovka
 Novonikolayevka
 Novy Kalkash
 Novy Mir
 Oktyabrevka
 Pervomaysky
 Pokrovka
 Rayevka
 Rodionovka
 Saraysino
 Sary-Yelga
 Sergeyevka
 Starolyubino
 Stary Kalkash
 Sterlibashevo
 Tabulda
 Turmayevo
 Tyater-Araslanovo
 Tyaterbash
 Uchugan-Asanovo
 Umetbatovo
 Verkhneshakarovo
 Verkhny Allaguvat
 Verkhny Gulyum
 Yangurcha
 Yasherganovo
 Yelimbetovo
 Yumaguzino

Sterlitamaksky District 
Rural localities in Sterlitamaksky District:

 Abdrakhmanovo
 Alatana
 Alga
 Asavo-Zubovo
 Ashkadar
 Aygulevo
 Ayuchevo
 Bayrak
 Begenyash
 Belskoye
 Beryozovka
 Bogolyubovka
 Bolshoy Kuganak
 Bolshoye Aksakovo
 Buguruslanovka
 Burikazganovo
 Cherkassy
 Chulpan
 Churtan
 Chuvashsky Kuganak
 Dergachevka
 Fedoro-Petrovka
 Grigoryevka
 Ishparsovo
 Kantyukovka
 Karmaskaly
 Kateninovsky
 Kazadayevka
 Khripunovsky
 Kononovsky
 Konstantino-Alexandrovka
 Konstantinogradovka
 Kosyakovka
 Krasnoarmeyskaya
 Kucherbayevo
 Kunakbayevo
 Kuzminovka
 Latypovka
 Lyubovka
 Mariinsky
 Markovsky
 Marshanovka
 Maryevka
 Matveyevka
 Maximovka
 Maxyutovo
 Mikhaylovka
 Mikryukovka
 Muravey
 Murdashevo
 Naumovka
 Nikolayevka
 Nikolayevka
 Nizhniye Usly
 Novaya Otradovka
 Novaya Vasilyevka
 Novoabdrakhmanovo
 Novoaleshkino
 Novofyodorovskoye
 Novomukatovka
 Novonikolayevka
 Novonikolayevsky
 Novoye Baryatino
 Novy Krasnoyar
 Oktyabrskoye
 Ozerkovka
 Pervomayskoye
 Petropavlovka
 Petrovka
 Podlesnoye
 Pokrovka
 Pokrovka
 Pokrovka-Ozerki
 Pomryaskino
 Preobrazhenovka
 Ranny Rassvet
 Roshchinsky
 Ryazanovka
 Rybkinsky
 Sadovka
 Saratovka
 Severnaya
 Shikhany
 Sokolovka
 Solovyovka
 Spasskoye
 Staroye Baryatino
 Sungur
 Talachevo
 Talalayevka
 Taneyevka
 Tyuryushlya
 Uslybash
 Ust-Zigan
 Vasilyevka
 Vedenovka
 Vedernikovsky
 Verkhniye Usly
 Vesyoly
 Vladimirovka
 Vostochny
 Yablunovka
 Yeslevsky
 Yuraktau
 Yuzhny
 Zabelskoye
 Zagorodny
 Zalivnoy
 Zolotonoshka

Tatyshlinsky District 
Rural localities in Tatyshlinsky District:

 1st Yanaul
 1st Zirimzibash
 2nd Zirimzibash
 Achu-Yelga
 Aksaitovo
 Alga
 Aribash
 Aribashevo
 Artaulovo
 Asavdy
 Auk-Bulyak
 Badryashevo
 Bashkibash
 Baykibash
 Belyashevo
 Bigineyevo
 Biz
 Bul-Kaypanovo
 Burgynbash
 Chishma
 Churguldy
 Dubovka
 Fanga
 Garibashevo
 Ilmetovo
 Ivanovka
 Kaltyayevo
 Kardagushevo
 Karmanovo
 Kashkakovo
 Kustarevka
 Kytki-Yelga
 Malaya Balzuga
 Mamatayevo
 Managaz
 Maysk
 Nikolsk
 Nizhnebaltachevo
 Nizhneye Kaltyayevo
 Novochukurovo
 Novokaypanovo
 Novyye Irakty
 Novyye Tatyshly
 Petropavlovka
 Sarashtybash
 Savaleyevo
 Savkiyaz
 Shulganovo
 Staroakbulatovo
 Starochukurovo
 Starokalmiyarovo
 Starokaypanovo
 Starosoldovo
 Stary Kurdym
 Stary Kyzyl-Yar
 Stary Shardak
 Stary Sikiyaz
 Tanyp-Chishma
 Tanypovka
 Tashkent
 Urazgildy
 Utar-Yelga
 Uyadybash
 Verkhnebaltachevo
 Verkhnekudashevo
 Verkhniye Tatyshly
 Verkhnyaya Salayevka
 Vyazovka
 Yalgyz-Narat
 Yuda
 Yurmiyazbash
 Yusupovo
 Zilyaktau
 Zirimzi

Tuymazinsky District 
Rural localities in Tuymazinsky District:

 Ablaevo
 Adnagulovo
 Agirtamak
 Alexandrovka
 Alexeyevka
 Ardatovka
 Atyk
 Aytaktamak
 Bakhchisaray
 Balagach-Kul
 Baltayevo
 Bayrakatuba
 Bereskletovskogo Khozyaystva
 Bikmetovo
 Bishkurayevo
 Bulat
 Byatki
 Chapayevo
 Chukadybashevo
 Chukadytamak
 Chuvash-Ulkanovo
 Darvino
 Duslyk
 Frunze
 Gafurovo
 Gorny
 Ilchimbetovo
 Imangulovo
 Imyan-Kuper
 Ismailovo
 Kain-Yelga
 Kakrybashevo
 Kalshali
 Kamyshtau
 Kandry
 Kandry-Kutuy
 Kandry-Tyumekeyevo
 Kandrykul
 Karamaly-Gubeyevo
 Karan-Bishindy
 Karan-Yelga
 Karat-Tamak
 Karatovo
 Karmalka
 Kaznakovka
 Kendektamak
 Kiska-Yelga
 Konstantinovka
 Kozhay-Andreyevo
 Kuyutamak
 Kyzyl-Bulyak
 Kyzyl-Tash
 Leonidovka
 Lipovy Klyuch
 Maloye Bikmeyevo
 Maxyutovo
 Mayskoye
 Metevtamak
 Mulla-Kamysh
 Mustafino
 Nichka-Bulyak
 Nikitinka
 Nikolayevka
 Nizhnetroitsky
 Nizhniye Bishindy
 Nizhny Sardyk
 Nizhnyaya Karan-Yelga
 Novoarslanbekovo
 Novonaryshevo
 Novosukkulovo
 Novy Arslan
 Novyye Bishindy
 Nur
 Nurkeyevo
 Olkhovka
 Pervomayskoye
 Pokrovka
 Rayevka
 Raymanovo
 Samsykovo
 Sayranovo
 Serafimovka
 Serafimovsky
 Staroarslanbekovo
 Staroye Subkhankulovo
 Staryye Kandry
 Staryye Tuymazy
 Subkhankulovo
 Tash-Kichu
 Tatar-Ulkanovo
 Timirovo
 Tiryan-Yelga
 Tukayevo
 Tukmak-Karan
 Tuktagulovo
 Tyumenyak
 Tyupkildy
 Urmekeyevo
 Urnyak
 Uyazytamak
 Verkhnetroitskoye
 Verkhniye Bishindy
 Verkhny Sardyk
 Vozdvizhenka
 Yakshayevo
 Yaprykovo
 Yermukhametovo
 Yermunchino
 Zigityak

Uchalinsky District 
Rural localities in Uchalinsky District:

 Abdulkasimovo
 Absalyamovo
 Abzakovo
 Akhunovo
 Altyntash
 Amangildino
 Aslayevo
 Aznashevo
 Battalovo
 Bazargulovo
 Burangulovo
 Buyda
 Gadelshino
 Galiakhmerovo
 Ilchigulovo
 Ilchino
 Iltebanovo
 Ilyinka
 Imangulovo
 Ishkinovo
 Ishmekeyevo
 Istamgulovo
 Kaipkulovo
 Kalkanovo
 Kaluyevo
 Karaguzhino
 Karimovo
 Kazakkulovo
 Kazhayevo
 Kidysh
 Kiryabinskoye
 Komsomolsk
 Kubagushevo
 Kubyakovo
 Kuchukovo
 Kuchukovo-Mayak
 Kudashevo
 Kulushevo
 Kunakbayevo
 Kurama
 Kutuyevo
 Malokazakkulovo
 Malomuynakovo
 Mansurovo
 Mindyak
 Mishkino
 Moskovo
 Muldakayevo
 Muldashevo
 Musino
 Nauruzovo
 Novobayramgulovo
 Novokhusainovo
 Oktyabrsk
 Orlovka
 Ozerny
 Pervy May
 Polyakovka
 Rasulevo
 Rysayevo
 Safarovo
 Saytakovo
 Sharipovo
 Shartym
 Starobalbukovo
 Starobayramgulovo
 Staromuynakovo
 Suleymanovo
 Suramanovo
 Suyargulovo
 Suyundyukovo
 Tanychau
 Tashmuryn
 Tatlembetovo
 Tungatarovo
 Uchaly
 Ural
 Uralsk
 Urazovo
 Urgunovo
 Ustinovo
 Uzungulovo
 Voznesenka
 Yagudino
 Yalchigulovo
 Yuldashevo

Ufa 
Rural localities in Ufa urban okrug:

 Arkaul
 Atayevka
 Fyodorovka
 Iskino
 Ivanovsky
 Karpovo
 Knyazevo
 Korolyovo
 Lokotki
 Mokrousovo
 Nagayevo
 Nikolsky
 Novyye Cherkassy
 Polyana
 Posyolok Kamyshlinskogo melkombinata
 Posyolok Uchastka Nagayevskogo lesnichestva
 Samokhvalovka
 Staryye Turbasly
 Urshak
 Vetoshnikovo
 Votikeyevo
 Yelkibayevo
 Zhilino
 Zinino

Ufimsky District 
Rural localities in Ufimsky District:

 Alexeyevka
 Asanovo
 Avdon
 Beryozovka
 Beygulovo
 Bulgakovo
 Burtsevo
 Cherkassy
 Chernolesovsky
 Chernovsky
 Chesnokovka
 Chuvarez
 Debovka
 Derevnya Geofizikov
 Dmitriyevka
 Dorogino
 Dubki
 Dubrava
 Fomichevo
 Fyodorovka
 Glumilino
 Gornovo
 Gribovka
 Kamyshly
 Karmasan
 Karyugino
 Kazyrovo
 Kirillovo
 Kolokoltsevo
 Krasny Yar
 Kruchinino
 Kryuchevka
 Kumlekul
 Kundryak
 Lavochnoye
 Lebyazhy
 Lekarevka
 Lesnoy
 Marmylevo
 Mikhaylovka
 Milovka
 Mudarisovo
 Mysovtsevo
 Nachapkino
 Nikolayevka
 Nizhegorodka
 Novotroyevka
 Novyye Karashidy
 Nurlino
 Oktyabrsky
 Olkhovoye
 Opytnoye Khozyaystvo
 Osorgino
 Pervomaysky
 Peschany
 Podymalovo
 Pokrovka
 Rozhdestvensky
 Russky Yurmash
 Selo Yumatovskogo Selkhoztekhnikuma
 Selo sanatoriya Yumatovo imeni 15-letiya BASSR
 Selo stantsii Yumatovo
 Sergeyevka
 Shamonino
 Shemyak
 Shmidtovo
 Speransky
 Stukolkino
 Surovka
 Svetlaya
 Taptykovo
 Taush
 Torfyanoy
 Uptino
 Ushakovo
 Vavilovo
 Volkovo
 Volkovo
 Volno-Sukharevo
 Yagodnaya Polyana
 Yakshivanovo
 Yasny
 Yulushevo
 Yumatovo
 Yuzhnaya
 Zagorsky
 Zhukovo
 Zubovo

Yanaulsky District 
Rural localities in Yanaulsky District:

 Akhtiyal
 Akylbay
 Andreyevka
 Andreyevka
 Arlyan
 Asavdybash
 Atlegach
 Aybulyak
 Badryash
 Badryash-Aktau
 Banibash
 Barabanovka
 Bayguzino
 Baysarovo
 Budya Varyash
 Bulat-Yelga
 Changakul
 Cheraul
 Chetyrman
 Chulpan
 Gudburovo
 Igrovka
 Irdugan
 Isanbayevo
 Iskhak
 Istyak
 Itkineyevo
 Izhboldino
 Karman-Aktau
 Karmanovo (selo)
 Karmanovo (village)
 Kaymasha
 Kaymashbash
 Kichikir
 Kisak-Kain
 Konigovo
 Kostino
 Kumalak
 Kumovo
 Kush-Imyan
 Kyzyl-Yar
 Maximovo
 Mesyagutovo
 Mozhga
 Nanyady
 Nikolsk
 Nizhny Chat
 Nokrat
 Norkanovo
 Novaya Kirga
 Novaya Orya
 Novokudashevo
 Novotroitsk
 Novy Aldar
 Novy Artaul
 Novy Kuyuk
 Novy Susadybash
 Novy Varyash
 Orlovka
 Oshya-Tau
 Petrovka
 Progress
 Rabak
 Sabanchi
 Salikhovo
 Sandugach
 Shmelkovka
 Shudek
 Shudimari
 Sibady
 Staraya Orya
 Starokudashevo
 Stary Aldar
 Stary Artaul
 Stary Kuyuk
 Stary Susadybash
 Stary Varyash
 Sultyevo
 Susady-Ebalak
 Tartar
 Tash-Yelga
 Tatarskaya Urada
 Tau
 Turtyk
 Urakayevo
 Ural
 Varyash
 Varyashbash
 Verkhny Chat
 Verkhnyaya Barabanovka
 Votskaya Oshya
 Votskaya Urada
 Voyady
 Yamady
 Yambayevo
 Yamyady
 Yanbaris
 Yangus-Narat
 Yugamash
 Yussukovo
 Zaytsevo
 Zirka

Yermekeyevsky District 
Rural localities in Yermekeyevsky District:

 Abdulkarimovo
 Abdulovo
 Atamkul
 Axakovo
 Beketovo
 Bogorodsky
 Bolshezingereyevo
 Chulpan
 Gorodetskoye
 Ik
 Islambakhty
 Kalinovka
 Khoroshovka
 Knyazevka
 Kozhay-Maximovo
 Kulbayevo
 Kupcheneyevo
 Kushkaran
 Kyzyl-Yar
 Lyakhovo
 Mikhaylovka
 Nikitinka
 Nizhneulu-Yelga
 Nizhniye Karmaly
 Novonikolayevka
 Novoshakhovo
 Novoturayevo
 Novoyermekeyevo
 Novy
 Novyye Sulli
 Pionersky
 Raymanovo
 Ryatamak
 Selo imeni 8 Marta
 Semeno-Makarovo
 Spartak
 Sredniye Karmaly
 Staroshakhovo
 Staroturayevo
 Staryye Sulli
 Sukkulovo
 Suyermetovo
 Sysoyevka
 Taldy-Bulak
 Tarkazy
 Usman-Tashly
 Vasilyevka
 Verkhneulu-Yelga
 Yelan-Chishma
 Yermekeyevo
 Znamenka

Zianchurinsky District 
Rural localities in Zianchurinsky District:

 Abulyaisovo
 Abzanovo
 Agurda
 Akdavletovo
 Alibayevo
 Arsyonovo
 Ayutovo
 Baishevo
 Bashkirskaya Chumaza
 Bashkirskaya Urginka
 Bashkirsky Barmak
 Baydavletovo
 Bikbau
 Bikkuzha
 Bishtiryak
 Bogdanovka
 Buzhan
 Derevnya fermy 3 Sakmarskogo sovkhoza
 Gabbasovo
 Georgiyevsky
 Ibrayevo
 Idelbakovo
 Idyash
 Ilmalya
 Ishemgul
 Isyangulovo
 Itkulovo
 Ivanovka
 Kalimullino
 Kalininsky
 Karadygan
 Kargala
 Kazanka
 Khudabandino
 Kinzyabulatovo
 Kugarchi
 Kuzebekovo
 Kuzhanak
 Kyzylyarovo
 Luch
 Lukyanovsky
 Malinovka
 Maloye Baydavletovo
 Maly Muynak
 Mazitovo
 Mukhamedyanovo
 Nazarovo
 Niyazgulovo
 Nizhneye Mambetshino
 Nizhny Muynak
 Nizhny Sarabil
 Nizhnyaya Akberda
 Nizhnyaya Bikberda
 Novokasmartsky
 Novomikhaylovsky
 Novonikolayevka
 Novopavlovka
 Novopetrovskoye
 Novyye Chebenki
 Russkaya Urginka
 Sagitovo
 Sazala
 Seregulovo
 Sredny Muynak
 Suleymanovo
 Tazlarovo
 Tiryakle
 Trushino
 Umbetovo
 Utyagulovo
 Verkhneye Mambetshino
 Verkhny Muynak
 Verkhny Sarabil
 Verkhnyaya Bikberda
 Yangi-Yul
 Yanybayevo
 Yuldybayevo
 Yunayevo

Zilairsky District 
Rural localities in Zilairsky District:

 Annovka
 Aralbayevo
 Ashkadarovo
 Balapan
 Bayguzhino
 Berdyash Russky
 Berdyash
 Berezovka
 Bikyan
 Chuyunchi-Chupanovo
 Dmitriyevka
 Iskuzhino
 Ivano-Kuvalat
 Izhbuldy
 Kadyrsha
 Kamysh-Uzyak
 Kananikolskoye
 Kanzafarovo
 Kartlazma
 Kashkarovo
 Krasny Kushak
 Kyzlar-Birgan
 Maloyuldybayevo
 Matrayevo
 Maxyutovo
 Muchetbar
 Nadezhdinsky
 Nizhnegaleyevo
 Novoalexandrovka
 Novopokrovsky
 Novopreobrazhensky
 Novoyakupovo
 Petrovka
 Sabyrovo
 Salyakhovo
 Saratovsky
 Shansky
 Sidorovka
 Sosnovka
 Staroyakupovo
 Sultanmirovo
 Surtan-Uzyak
 Talikha
 Vasilyevka
 Verkhnegaleyevo
 Verkhnesalimovo
 Verkhnyaya Kazarma
 Vladimirovo-Nikolayevsky
 Voskresenskoye
 Voznesensky
 Yamansaz
 Yaparsaz
 Yuldybayevo
 Yumaguzhino
 Zilair

See also
  
 Lists of rural localities in Russia

References

Bashkortostan